Gordon Dahlquist is an American playwright and novelist. A native of the Pacific Northwest, Dahlquist has lived and worked in New York City since 1988. His plays, which include Messalina and Delirium Palace (both Garland Playwriting Award winners), have been performed in New York and Los Angeles. Graduate of Reed College and Columbia University’s School of the Arts. He is an alumnus of New Dramatists.

Dahlquist's debut novel The Glass Books of the Dream Eaters, a hybrid of fantasy and science fiction set in a period similar to the Victorian era, was published on August 1, 2006, to notable critical acclaim. Dahlquist was reportedly paid an advance of $2,000,000 for The Glass Books of the Dream Eaters, the first of a two-book deal. Its sales were disappointing and it is estimated to have lost its publisher, Bantam, approximately $851,500.  The sequel to The Glass Books of the Dream Eaters, The Dark Volume, was published in the UK by Penguin on May 1, 2008, and March 24, 2009 in the United States.  A third volume, The Chemickal Marriage was published in July 2012.  A young adult novel, The Different Girl was published in 2013. In 2015 he received the James Tait Black Prize for his play Tomorrow Come Today.

Plays 

Babylon 55 (with Mark Worthington), premiere Sumus Theatre, Portland, OR, 1984
Reticence, premiere Horace Mann Theatre NYC
Severity's Mistress, premiere Walker Space NYC, 1995
Mission Byzantium, premiere The American Globe Theater NYC, 1995
Island of Dogs, premiere 4th Street Theater NYC, 1998
Vortex du Plaisir, premiere Ohio Theater NYC, 1999
The Secret Machine, premiere Walker Space NYC, 1999
Delirium Palace, premiere Evidence Room LA CA, 2001
Messalina, premiere Evidence Room LA CA, 2003
Babylon is Everywhere: A Court Masque, premiere NYC 2004
Venice Saved: A Seminar (with David Levine), premiere PS122 NYC, 2009
Tea Party, workshop premiere Bay Area Playwrights Foundation, 2012
Tomorrow Comes Today, premiere Undermain Theatre, Dallas, 2014
Red Chariot, premiere Undermain Theatre, Dallas, 2019

Novels 

The Glass Books of the Dream Eaters (2006)
The Dark Volume (2008)
The Chemickal Marriage (2012)
The Different Girl  (2013)

Bibliography, Plays 

Vortex du Plaisir, Playscripts Inc. 
Delirium Palace, Breaking Ground, Stage & Screen, 2002
Babylon is Everywhere, Theater Magazine, Vol 34 #2, 2004

Bibliography, Novels 

The Glass Books of the Dream Eaters, Bantam 2006
The Dark Volume, Bantam 2009
The Chemickal Marriage, Penguin 2012
The Different Girl, Dutton Juvenile, 2013

References

External links
AOI Agency 
Author's Bio
Biography and interview at bookreporter.com
Author's Q&A with Powell's Books
Interview with G W Dahlquist on Author's Lounge TV

  CiNE: An Immodest Proposal for the Public Theater, Theater Magazine
Different Girl Interview with Sara Ryan

Living people
21st-century American novelists
American dramatists and playwrights
American fantasy writers
American male novelists
Reed College alumni
American male dramatists and playwrights
21st-century American male writers
Year of birth missing (living people)